Adèle de Ponthieu is an opera by the French composers Jean-Benjamin de La Borde and Pierre Montan Berton, first performed at the Académie Royale de Musique, Paris (the Paris Opera) on 1 December 1772. It takes the form of a tragédie lyrique in three acts. The libretto was written by Jean-Paul-André Razins de Saint-Marc, after a tragedy by Pierre-Antoine de La Place, staged  at the Comédie-Française in 1757.

The opera had little success in its first run and was only revived in 1775 in five acts, for 38 performances, before being withdrawn for good. The three-act libretto, however, was later set by Niccolò Piccinni in 1781.

Roles

References
Notes

Sources
 Théodore Lajarte, Bibliothèque Musicale du  Théatre de l'Opéra. Catalogue Historique, Chronologique, Anecdotique, Tome 1, Paris, Librairie des bibliophiles, 1878 (copy at Internet Archive)
 Spire Pitou, The Paris Opéra. An Encyclopedia of Operas, Ballets, Composers, and Performers – Rococo and Romantic, 1715-1815, Greenwood Press, Westport/London, 1985. 
  Original 1772 libretto at Gallica, BNF
 Félix Clément and Pierre Larousse Dictionnaire des Opéras, p. 6

1772 operas
Operas
French-language operas
Tragédies en musique
Operas by Jean-Benjamin de La Borde